Tsai Chih Chung (born 1948) is a famous cartoonist born in Huatan, Changhua County, Taiwan. He is best known for his graphical works on Chinese philosophy and history, most notably the philosophers Laozi, Liezi, and Zhuangzi, which he made accessible and popularized through the use of plain language and visual aid of cartoon graphics. Many of his earlier four paneled works contain elements of political satire and those which are purely comical such as his well-known work, The Drunken Swordsman (大醉俠).

The books of Tsai Chih Chung have been very well received by the public in both Taiwan and mainland China. They have subsequently been translated into dozens of languages including English. He currently resides in Taiwan and Hangzhou, China.

Awards
 1979: Golden Horse Film Festival and Awards for his work on Old Master Q (老夫子)
 1985: The 23rd "Republic of China's Ten Outstanding Young Persons" (中華民國十大傑出青年) for his graphical work on Zhuangzi (莊子說)
 1999: Prince Claus Award for "Creating Spaces of Freedom"

See also
Taiwanese art

References

External links
 Cai Zhizhong: A Master Cartoonist
 Tsai Chih Chung at the Lambiek Comiclopedia

Taiwanese comics artists
1948 births
Living people
Taiwanese artists
People from Changhua County